Antoine Grumbach is a French architect who amongst others designed Disney's Sequoia Lodge hotel at Disneyland Resort Paris.

References

1942 births
Living people
People from Oran
20th-century French architects
French urban planners
Lycée Carnot alumni
École pratique des hautes études alumni